Denman may refer to:


Places
 Denman Glacier, near Antarctica
 Denman Shire, New South Wales, Australia
 Denman, New South Wales, a town in the Hunter Valley of Australia
 Denman Island, one of the Gulf Islands of British Columbia, Canada
 Denman, Nebraska, a community in the United States
 Denman Wildlife Area, Rogue Valley, Oregon, United States
 Denman Mountain, New York, United States
 Denman Peak, Washington, United States

People
 Denman (surname), people with the surname
 Denman Fink (1880–1956), American artist and magazine illustrator
 Denman Ross (1853–1935), American painter, art collector and professor

Other uses
 Denman (horse), a racehorse, winner of the 2008 Cheltenham Gold Cup
 Denman Arena, a sports arena located in Vancouver, British Columbia
 Denman College, an adult education college in Oxfordshire, England

See also
 Baron Denman, a title in the peerage of the United Kingdom